Hugh of Lincoln, O.Cart. ( – 16 November 1200), also known as Hugh of Avalon, was a French-born Benedictine and Carthusian monk, bishop of Lincoln in the Kingdom of England, and Catholic saint. His feast is observed by Catholics on 16 November and by Anglicans on 17 November.

Life
Hugh was born at the château of Avalon, at the border of the Dauphiné with Savoy, the son of Guillaume, seigneur of Avalon. His mother Anne de Theys died when he was eight and, because his father was a soldier, he went to a boarding school for his education. Guillaume retired from the world to the Augustinian monastery of Villard-Benoît, near Grenoble, and took his son Hugh, with him.

At the age of fifteen, Hugh became a religious novice and was ordained a deacon at the age of nineteen. About 1159, he was sent to be prior of the nearby monastery at Saint-Maximin, presumably already a priest. From that community, he left the Benedictine Order and entered the Grande Chartreuse, then at the height of its reputation for the rigid austerity of its rules and the earnest piety of its members. There he rose to become procurator of his new Order, in which office he served until he was sent in 1179 to become prior of the Witham Charterhouse in Somerset, the first Carthusian house in England.

Henry II of England, as part of his penance for the murder of Thomas Becket, in lieu of going on crusade as he had promised in his first remorse, had established a Carthusian charterhouse sometime before, which was settled by monks brought from the Grande Chartreuse. There were difficulties in advancing the building works, however, and the first prior was retired and a second soon died. It was by the special request of the English king that Hugh, whose fame had reached him through one of the nobles of Maurienne, was made prior.

Hugh found the monks in dire straits, living in log huts and with no plans yet advanced for the more permanent monastery building. Hugh interceded with the king for royal patronage and at last, probably on 6 January 1182, Henry issued a charter of foundation and endowment for Witham Charterhouse.  His first attention was given to the building of the Charterhouse. He prepared his plans and submitted them for royal approbation, exacting full compensation from the king for any tenants on the royal estate who would have to be evicted to make room for the building. Hugh presided over the new house till 1186 and attracted many to the community. Among the frequent visitors was King Henry, for the charterhouse lay near the borders of the king's chase in Selwood Forest, a favourite hunting ground. Hugh admonished Henry for keeping dioceses vacant in order to keep their income for the royal chancellery.

In May 1186, Henry summoned a council of bishops and barons at Eynsham Abbey to deliberate on the state of the Church and the filling of vacant bishoprics, including Lincoln. On 25 May 1186 the cathedral chapter of Lincoln was ordered to elect a new bishop and Hugh was elected. Hugh insisted on a second, private election by the canons, securely in their  chapterhouse at Lincoln rather than in the king's chapel. His election was confirmed by the result.

Hugh was consecrated Bishop of Lincoln on 21 September 1186 at Westminster. Almost immediately he established his independence of the King, excommunicating a royal forester and refusing to seat one of Henry's courtly nominees as a prebendary of Lincoln; he softened the king's anger by his diplomatic address and tactful charm. After the excommunications, he came upon the king hunting and was greeted with dour silence. He waited several minutes and the king called for a needle to sew up a leather bandage on his finger. Eventually Hugh said, with gentle mockery, "How much you remind me of your cousins of Falaise" (where William I's unmarried mother Herleva, a tanner's daughter, had come from). At this Henry just burst out laughing and was reconciled. As a bishop, he was exemplary, constantly in residence or travelling within his diocese, generous with his charity, and scrupulous in the appointments he made. He raised the quality of education at the cathedral school.  Hugh was also prominent in trying to protect the Jews, great numbers of whom lived in Lincoln, in the persecution they suffered at the beginning of Richard I's reign, and he put down popular violence against them – as later occurred following the death of Little Saint Hugh of Lincoln – in several places.

Lincoln Cathedral had been badly damaged by an earthquake in 1185, and Hugh set about rebuilding and greatly enlarging it in the new Gothic style; however, he only lived to see the choir well begun. In 1194, he expanded the St Mary Magdalen's Church, Oxford. Along with Bishop Herbert of Salisbury, Hugh resisted the king's demand for 300 knights for a year's service in his French wars; the entire revenue of both men's offices was then seized by royal agents.

As one of the premier bishops of the Kingdom of England Hugh more than once accepted the role of diplomat to France for Richard and then for King John in 1199, a trip that ruined his health. He consecrated St Giles' Church, Oxford, in 1200. There is a cross consisting of interlaced circles cut into the western column of the tower that is believed to commemorate this. Also in commemoration of the consecration, St Giles' Fair was established and continues to this day each September. While attending a national council in London, a few months later, he was stricken with an unnamed ailment and died two months later on 16 November 1200. He was buried in Lincoln Cathedral.

Bishop Hugh was responsible for the building of the first (wooden) Bishop's Palace at Buckden in Huntingdonshire, halfway between Lincoln and London. Later additions to the Palace were more substantial and a tall brick tower was added in 1475, protected by walls and a moat, and surrounded by an outer bailey. It was used by the bishops until 1842. The Palace, now known as Buckden Towers, is owned by the Claretians and is used as a retreat and conference centre. A Catholic church, dedicated to St Hugh, is located on the site.

Veneration

Hugh was canonised by Pope Honorius III on 17 February 1220, and is the patron saint of sick children, sick people, shoemakers and swans. Hugh is honoured in the Church of England with a Lesser Festival and in the Episcopal Church (USA) on 17 November.

Hugh's Vita, or written life, was composed by his chaplain Adam of Eynsham, a Benedictine monk and his constant associate; it remains in manuscript form in the Bodleian Library in Oxford.

Hugh is the eponym of St Hugh's College, Oxford, where a 1926 statue of the saint stands on the stairs of the Howard Piper Library. In his right hand, he holds an effigy of Lincoln Cathedral, and his left hand rests on the head of a swan.

At Avalon, a round tower in the Romantic Gothic style was built by the Carthusians in 1895 in Hugh's honour on the site of the castle where he was born.

Iconography
Hugh's primary emblem is a white swan, in reference to the story of the swan of Stow, Lincolnshire (site of a palace of the bishops of Lincoln) which had a deep and lasting friendship with the saint, even guarding him while he slept. The swan would follow him about, and was his constant companion while he was at Lincoln. Hugh loved all the animals in the monastery gardens, especially a wild swan that would eat from his hand and follow him about, and yet the swan would attack anyone else who came near Hugh.

Legacy
Both Buckden Towers, and the local Roman Catholic Church in nearby St Neots, are administered by the Claretians. In Lincoln, there is the Roman Catholic St Hugh's Church. There are many parish churches dedicated to St Hugh of Lincoln throughout England including the Church of St Hugh of Lincoln in Letchworth founded by Adrian Fortescue.

A number of churches are dedicated to St Hugh of Lincoln in the United States, including: Episcopal Churches in Elgin, Illinois; and Allyn, Washington; St Hugh of Lincoln Roman Catholic Church, Huntington Station, New York and St Hugh of Lincoln Roman Catholic Church in Milwaukee, Wisconsin, St Hugh Roman Catholic Church and School in Coconut Grove, Miami, Florida.

In 2018 St Hugh was made a subject of the BBC Radio 4 drama The Man who bit Mary Magdalene by Colin Bytheway, starring David Jason as the bishop in search of relics that would help in the construction of Lincoln Cathedral.

Notes

References

 
 British History Online Bishops of Lincoln accessed on 28 October 2007
 King, Richard John Handbook to the Cathedrals of England: Eastern Division (1862) (On-line text).
 La tour d'Avalon accessed on 28 October 2007 – In French

External links
 Catholic Saints Info: St. Hugh of Lincoln
 Friends of Buckden Towers
 The RC Parish of St Hugh of Lincoln Buckden and St Joseph in St Neots

Bishops of Lincoln
1130s births
1200 deaths
Carthusian bishops
English priors
English tax resisters
History of Catholicism in England
Incorrupt saints
Carthusian saints
Medieval English saints
People from Isère
Pre-Reformation Anglican saints
12th-century Christian saints
12th-century English Roman Catholic bishops
Anglican saints
English Roman Catholic saints
English Roman Catholics
People associated with St Hugh's College, Oxford